All Rise is an American legal drama television series created by Greg Spottiswood that premiered on CBS on September 23, 2019, as a Monday night entry in the 2019–20 television season. In May 2021, the series was canceled by CBS after two seasons before being picked up for a third season by the Oprah Winfrey Network (OWN) that September. The third season premiered on June 7, 2022.

Premise
All Rise revolves around the personal lives of judges, prosecutors, and public defenders in a Los Angeles courthouse.

The plot follows newly appointed Judge Lola Carmichael, a highly regarded and impressive former deputy district attorney who does not intend to sit back on the bench in her new role but instead leans in, immediately pushing the boundaries and challenging the expectations of what a judge can be.

Cast

Main
Simone Missick as Judge Lola Carmichael, an idealistic former prosecutor and newly appointed Judge of the Los Angeles County Superior Court. Lola is married to FBI Agent Robin Taylor and gave birth to their first baby in season 2. She was arrested during the COVID lockdown for defending a girl who was about to be arrested for no reason.
Wilson Bethel as Deputy District Attorney Mark Callan, a member of the Los Angeles County District Attorney's Office and best friend of Lola Carmichael. Mark is in a relationship with Amy Quinn. He came under scrutiny in season 2 for going after the LA Sheriff's office for a wrongful shooting.
Jessica Camacho as Emily Lopez (formerly Emily Lopez-Batista), an attorney with the Los Angeles County Public Defender's office who is in the process of divorcing her husband against whom she has a restraining order and was dating Luke Watkins. She and Luke broke up as a result of the Black Lives Matter protests but eventually get back together.
J. Alex Brinson as Deputy Sheriff Luke Watkins, a four-year veteran bailiff who plans to leave the Los Angeles County Sheriff's Department and become a lawyer upon law school graduation and is now a clerk in the DA's office alongside Sam Powell. Luke and Sam began a relationship in season 2.
Ruthie Ann Miles as Sherri Kansky, an experienced judge's assistant assigned to new Judge Lola Carmichael despite their difficult relationship.
Lindsay Mendez as Sara Castillo, a court reporter and friend of Emily Lopez. She moves to the D.A. office as an assistant in season 3.
Marg Helgenberger as Judge Lisa Benner (seasons 1–2; special guest season 3), a veteran/supervisory judge in the HOJ who is a mentor to Lola Carmichael.
Lindsey Gort as Amy Quinn (season 2–present; recurring season 1), a high-powered criminal defense attorney who shares a complicated history with Mark and who also later becomes Mark's girlfriend. Amy leaves her law firm to join Rachel's law firm. She and Mark get engaged at the end of season 2.
Audrey Corsa as Samantha Powell (season 2; recurring season 1), a clerk for the LA County DA's office who works with Mark and Luke.
Reggie Lee as Head DDA Thomas Choi (season 2; recurring season 1), Mark's boss. He is promoted and transferred to Pomona in between seasons 2 and 3.

Recurring
Mitch Silpa as DDA Clayton Berger (season 1; guest season 2), a hard-charging prosecutor who clashes with Lola.
Tony Denison as Vic Callan (season 1; guest season 2), Mark's father and a small-time bookie who gives Mark a hard time.
Paul McCrane as Judge Jonas Laski (seasons 1–2; guest season 3), a conservative judge known as the "Punisher".
Suzanne Cryer as DDA Maggie Palmer (seasons 1–2; guest season 3), an old colleague of Lola's and current DDA who accuses her of bias towards defendants.
Todd Williams (season 1–2) and Christian Keyes (guest season 3) as Robin Taylor, Lola's husband who works for the FBI.
Joe Williamson as Kevin Harris (season 1; guest season 2), a LAPD detective and romantic interest for Sherri.
Peter MacNicol as Judge Albert Campbell (seasons 1–2), one of Lola's colleagues.
Ryan Michelle Bathe as Rachel Audubon (seasons 1–2; special guest season 3), a rare powerhouse attorney who can handle both civil litigation and criminal law and who has known Lola since they were in Howard University together and has been best friends with Mark since they were in law school together. She goes to Los Angeles to start her own law firm known as Audubon and Associates, later renamed Audubon, Quinn, and Associates in season 3, after she makes Amy Quinn a partner.
Patricia Rae as Judge Abigail Delgado (seasons 1–2), one of Lola's colleagues.
L. Scott Caldwell as Roxy Robinson (seasons 1–2), Lola's mother.
Brent Jennings as Charles Carmichael (seasons 1, 3), Lola's father.
Bret Harrison as Ben Benner (season 1), Judge Benner's son and Sara's boyfriend.
Rebecca Field as Carol Coleman (season 2; guest seasons 1, 3)
Samantha Marie Ware as Vanessa "Ness" Johnson (season 2; guest season 3), Lola's new law clerk. She later joins Audubon, Quinn, and Associates in season 3.
Shalim Ortiz as Joaquin Luna (season 2)
Ian Anthony Dale as DA Louis Bravo (season 2; guest season 3)
Steven Williams as Tony Carver (season 2)
Louis Herthum as Sheriff Wayne McCarthy (season 2), a corrupt sheriff responsible for encouraging and covering up police misconduct among his deputies.
Anne Heche as Corrine Cuthbert (season 2; guest season 3)
Ashley Jones as Whitney Gessner (season 2)
Nev Scharrel as Nikki Gessner (season 2)
Rick Fox as August Fox (season 2)
Roger Guenveur Smith as Judge Marshall Thomas (season 3)
Ronak Gandhi as Teddy (season 3)

Notable guest stars
Colin Ford as Billy Webb ("Fool for Liv")
Jere Burns as Adam Pryce, an over-theatrical attorney to several Hollywood stars. ("Fool for Liv", "Bette Davis Eyes")
Ever Carradine as Felice Bell, Lola's old nemesis from her days as a district attorney. ("How to Succeed in Law Without Really Re-trying")
Alicia Coppola as Wanda Taylor ("What the Constitution Greens to Me")
Brenda Strong as Jean Rubenstein-Frost, Judge Benner's lawyer ex-girlfriend. ("My Fair Lockdown")
Dorian Missick as DJ Tailwind Turner ("Dancing at Los Angeles")
Tyler Barnhardt as Jesse Frost ("A Changes Is Gonna Come" and "Keep Ya Head Up")
Robyn Lively as Nancy Frost ("A Changes Is Gonna Come" and "Keep Ya Head Up")
Joel Gretsch as Frank Frost ("A Changes Is Gonna Come" and "Keep Ya Head Up")
Lesley Ann Warren as Samara Strong, an actress whom Mark idolized whom he prosecutes for the murder of her husband ("Bette Davis Eyes")
Amy Acker as Georgia Knight ("Georgia" and "Leap of Faith")
Ray Wise as Richard Walker ("Georgia")
Sarah Levy as Debbie Daines ("Georgia")
Charlayne Woodard as Judge Prudence Jenkins ("Caught Up in Circles")

Episodes

Series overview

Season 1 (2019–20)

Season 2 (2020–21)

Season 3 (2022)

Production

Development
On January 31, 2019, it was announced that CBS had given the production, then titled Courthouse, a pilot order. The pilot was written by Greg Spottiswood, who also served as an executive producer. Production companies involved with the pilot included Warner Bros. Television.

On May 9, 2019, it was announced that CBS had given the production, now titled All Rise, a series order. A day later, it was announced that the series would premiere during the 2019 U.S. fall TV season and air on Mondays at 9:00 p.m. A trailer for the series was released on May 15, 2019. The series debuted on September 23, 2019.

On October 22, 2019, the series received a full season order. On December 5, Dee Harris-Lawrence was announced to be replacing Sunil Nayar as a co-showrunner; she would be working alongside series developer Greg Spottiswood.

On April 6, 2020, it was announced that, amid the COVID-19 pandemic, an all-virtual episode would be produced about how the characters on the show handle a case while social distancing. The episode was filmed at the actors' respective homes using FaceTime, WebEx, and Zoom, and visual effects were used to replace the insides of their homes with that of their characters' homes.

On May 6, 2020, CBS renewed the series for a second season, which premiered on November 16, 2020. On May 15, 2021, CBS canceled the series after two seasons. On August 20, 2021, it was reported that OWN was negotiating with Warner Bros. Television for a potential third season. On September 29, 2021, OWN officially picked up the series for a third season, consisting of 20 episodes, which premiered on June 7, 2022.

Controversy
On August 20, 2020, it was reported that five writers left the series after clashing with the series's showrunner, Greg Spottiswood, over how racespecifically people of colorand gender were depicted. After complaints from staff members about Spottiswood's leadership, the human resources department of Warner Bros. Television Studios reviewed the series's workplace and "decided to keep him as the showrunner" but hired an African American female corporate coach to guide him. On March 24, 2021, Warner Bros. Television fired Spottiswood from the series due to the misconduct allegations.

Casting 
In February 2019, it was announced that Simone Missick had been cast in the pilot's lead role. The next month, it was reported that J. Alex Brinson, Lindsay Mendez, Marg Helgenberger, Ruthie Ann Miles, Jessica Camacho and Wilson Bethel had joined the cast. On August 20, 2019, Reggie Lee and Nadia Gray were cast in recurring roles. On September 10, 2019, it was reported that Mitch Silpa had been cast in a recurring capacity. On August 4, 2020, Lindsey Gort was promoted to a series regular for the second season. On September 29, 2020, Audrey Corsa was promoted to a series regular for the second season. On October 21, 2020, Reggie Lee was promoted to a series regular for the second season. On November 30, 2020, Anne Heche was cast in a recurring role for the second season. On February 9, 2022, Roger Guenveur Smith and Christian Keyes were cast in recurring roles for the third season; Keyes' role was originally played by Todd Williams.

Reception

Critical response
The review aggregator website Rotten Tomatoes reported a 56% approval rating with an average rating of 5.98/10, based on 16 reviews. The website's critical consensus states, "While All Rise can't quite rise above the shows it aspires to be, it shows potential for future growth while providing a decent showcase for Simone Missick." On Metacritic, it has a weighted average score of 62 out of 100, based on 10 critics, indicating "generally favorable reviews".

Ratings

Season 1

Throughout its first eight episodes, All Rise was the highest-rated freshman program of the 2019–20 television season. The series averaged 7million viewers a week, in Nielsen's Live-plus-three day viewership.

Season 2

Season 3

Accolades

References

External links

2019 American television series debuts
2010s American workplace drama television series
2010s American legal television series
2020s American workplace drama television series
2020s American legal television series
American legal drama television series
American television series revived after cancellation
CBS original programming
Courtroom drama television series
English-language television shows
Television productions suspended due to the COVID-19 pandemic
Television series by CBS Studios
Television series by Warner Bros. Television Studios
Television shows set in Los Angeles
Television shows about the COVID-19 pandemic
Oprah Winfrey Network original programming
Television series about prosecutors